"Handsome and Gretel" is the third single by American punk band Babes in Toyland. It was released on 7" vinyl, and its songs later appeared on the band's second studio album, Fontanelle.

Artwork
There are two versions of the single's cover. The most known one is of singer, Kat Bjelland, sitting in a police car with blood on her legs after getting into a car accident in Arizona in 1988. Drummer Lori Barbero talks about this incident in a 1989 issue of the zine, No Idea: 

The back cover art features drummer Lori Barbero, with what appears to be a nosebleed.

Release
The single was released on June 1, 1991 as a limited edition 7" by the independent Australian label Insipid Records. On August 22, 2016, Blank Recording Co. re-released the single on 7" vinyl.

Track listing

Personnel
Musicians
Kat Bjellandvocals, guitar
Lori Barberodrums 
Michelle Leonbass

Technical
Tim Macengineering, production
Abaddonphotography

References

1991 singles
Babes in Toyland (band) songs
Songs written by Kat Bjelland
1991 songs